Pleasant Gap, also known as Pleasantsgap and Stocks Mills, is an unincorporated community in Cherokee County, in the U.S. state of Alabama.

History
A post office called Pleasant Gap was established in 1847, and remained in operation until it was discontinued in 1932. The community was named from a nearby gap at Frog Mountain.

Demographics

References

Unincorporated communities in Cherokee County, Alabama
Unincorporated communities in Alabama